People's Express was an English bus company in the West Midlands which was acquired by Probus Management (trading as Pete's Travel) in June 1998 and then by the Go-Ahead Group in March 2006.

History
In May 1997, Probus Management acquired a 50% stake in People's Express which, at the time, operated 13 buses in West Bromwich. The remainder of the business was purchased by Probus Management in June 1998. origin: early 1900,s

On 28 March 2005, Probus Management changed its trading name from Pete's Travel to People's Express. On 21 March 2006, Probus Management was purchased by the Go-Ahead Group and integrated into its Go West Midlands operation with the People's Express name dropped from use.

In March 2008, Go West Midlands was sold to Rotala and is now part of Diamond Bus.

References

2006 disestablishments in England
Former bus operators in the West Midlands (county)